Flavia (Latin for "blonde") may refer to:

Places
 Flavia Caesariensis, a 4th-century Roman province in the Diocese of the Britains
 Flaviac, a commune in southern France

People
 Flavia (gens), the Roman clan and imperial dynasty
 Flavia (name), a modern female personal name of Latin origin, most common in Italian and other Romance languages
 Flavia Fortunato, an Italian pop singer and television presenter
 Flavia Ottaviani, an Italian figure skater
 Flavia Pennetta, an Italian tennis player
 Flavia Cacace, a professional dancer
 Flavia Tumusiime, a Ugandan actress and radio and television host
 Flavia Sparacino, an American space maker and scientist
 Flavia Agnes, an Indian activist and lawyer
 Flavia Company, an Argentine novelist
 FLAVIA, an Irish/Italian activist and singer-songwriter

Art, entertainment, and media

Fictional entities
Chancellor Flavia, a character in the Doctor Who mythos
Princess Flavia, a character in the 1894 Anthony Hope novel The Prisoner of Zenda
 Flavia de Luce, a character in the mystery novel The Sweetness at the Bottom of the Pie
 Flavia Petrelli, a soprano who plays major roles in Donna Leon's Commissario Brunetti novels Death at La Fenice (1992), Acqua Alta (1996), and Falling in Love (2015)
 Flavia Mills, a character played by Margaret O'Brien in 1944's Tenth Avenue Angel
 Flavia Alba, a character in a series of mystery novels by Lindsey Davis, set in ancient Rome
 Flavia, a character in a French novel series Oceania by Helene Montardre
 Flavia Gemina, a character in a historical novel The Twelve Tasks of Flavia Gemina from the series The Roman Mysteries
 Flavia, a character in the video game Fire Emblem Awakening
 Flavia, a character and visual skin in the game Fortnite

Works
Flavia the Heretic, a 1974 film
Princess Flavia, a musical adaptation of The Prisoner of Zenda

Other uses
 Flavia Beverage Systems, a division of Mars that manufactures hot drinks
 Lancia Flavia, an Italian automobile
 , an Italian ocean liner

See also
 Flavio, a masculine form of the name 
 Flavius, a masculine form of the name